Anargyroi (before 1928: Ρούδνικ - Roudnik) is a village in Florina Regional Unit, Macedonia, Greece.

The Greek census (1920) recorded 133 people in the village and in 1923 there were 23 inhabitants (or 6 families) who were Muslim. Following the Greek-Turkish population exchange, in 1926 within Roudnik there was 1 refugee family from Pontus and 36 refugee families from the Caucasus. The Greek census (1928) recorded 341 village inhabitants. There were 60 refugee families (214 people) in 1928.

References 

Populated places in Florina (regional unit)

Amyntaio